Arsinoe or Arsinoites or Cleopatris or Cleopatra, was an ancient city at the northern extremity of the Heroopolite Gulf (Gulf of Suez), in the Red Sea.

History
Arsinoe was the capital of the Heroopolite nome, and one of the principal harbors belonging to Egypt. It appears to have been also denominated Cleopatris (Strabo p. 780) and Arsinoites (Plin. v. 9. § 9; Orelli, Inscr. 516). It is also conjectured to have stood on the site of the biblical Pi-hahiroth (Pihachiroth). Exodus ; Numbers ; Winer, Biblioth. Realwörterb. ii. p. 309. The modern Ardscherúd, a village near Suez, corresponds to this Arsinoe. It was seated near the eastern termination of the Royal canal, which communicated with the Pelusiac branch of the Nile, and which Ptolemy Philadelphus carried on from the Bitter Lakes to the head of the Heroopolite gulf. Arsinoe (Plin. v. 12) was ca. 200 km from Pelusium.

The revenues of the Arsinoite nome were presented by that monarch to his wife (who was also his sister), Arsinoe II of Egypt, after whom the city was named, and remained the property of successive queens or princesses of the Lagid family, including one of the Cleopatra's who changed the name into Cleopatris. The shortness of the road across the eastern desert and its position near the canal were the principal advantages of Arsinoe as a staple of trade. But although it possessed a capacious bay, its access from the south was difficult due to the prevailing northern winds. Arsinoe, accordingly, was less eligibly situated for the Indian traffic than either Myos Hormos or Berenice.

In popular culture 
Arsinoe is depicted in the first DLC (The Hidden Ones) of the 2017 video game Assassin's Creed Origins. It is shown as a town occupied by Romans, who tear down ancient Egyptian monuments for use as building materials in 38 BC.

References

Ptolemaic colonies
Populated coastal places in Egypt
Former populated places in Egypt
Ptolemaic colonies in the Red Sea
Lost ancient cities and towns